This is a list of Brazilian actors.

Actors

A 
 Abílio Pereira de Almeida
 Abrahão Farc
 Adoniran Barbosa
 Adilson Barros
 Adriano Reys
 Afonso Brazza
 Agildo Ribeiro
 Aílton Graça
 Alberto Guzik
 Alberto Perez
 Alberto Ruschel
 Aldo César
 Alexandre Barillari
 Alexandre Barros
 Alexandre Borges
 Alexandre Frota
 Alexandre Lippiani
 Alexandre Machado
 Alexandre Moreno
 Alexandre Nero
 Alexandre Rodrigues
 Alexandre Slaviero
 Alexandre Zacchia
 Altair Lima
 Amilton Fernandes
 Amir Haddad
 Anderson Lau
 Anderson Müller
 André Arteche
 André Barros
 André Di Mauro
 André Bankoff
 André de Biase
 André Frateschi
 André Gonçalves
 André Luiz Miranda
 André Marques
 André Mattos
 André Moraes
 André Pimentel
 André Segatti
 André Valli
 Ângelo Antônio
 Ângelo Paes Leme
 Ankito
 Anselmo Duarte
 Anselmo Vasconcelos
 Antônio Abujamra
 Antonio Calloni
 Antônio Carlos
 Antônio Carlos Pires
 Antônio Fagundes
 Antonio Grassi
 Antônio Monteiro
 Antônio Patiño
 Antonio Petrin
 Antônio Pitanga
 Antônio Pompeo
 Anthony Steffen
 Apolo Correia
 Ariel Coelho
 Arlindo Lopes
 Armando Bógus
 Armando Geraldo
 Arnaldo Silveira
 Arrelia
 Ary Fontoura
 Ary França
 Ary Toledo
 Átila Iório
 Aurélio Teixeira
 Aurimar Rocha

B 
 Babu Santana
 Bemvindo Sequeira
 Benjamin Cattan
 Bernardo Marinho
 Brandão Filho
 Breno Mello
 Bruno Abrahão
 Bruno de Luca
 Bruno Fagundes
 Bruno Ferrari
 Bruno Gagliasso
 Bruno Garcia
 Bruno Mazzeo
 Bruno Padilha
 Zózimo Bulbul
 Bukassa Kabengele
 Bussunda
 Buza Ferraz

C 
 Cacá Carvalho
 Caco Ciocler
 Caio Blat
 Caio Castro
 Caio Graco
 Caio Junqueira
 Caíque Ferreira
 Camilla Raffanti
 Camilo Bevilacqua
 Canarinho
 Carla Novaes
 Carlo Mossy
 Carlos Alberto
 Carlos Alberto Riccelli
 Carlos Augusto Strazzer
 Carlos Bonow
 Carlos Casagrande
 Carlos Duval
 Carlos Eduardo Dolabella
 Carlos Evelyn
 Carlos Farielo
 Carlos Gregório
 Carlos Imperial
 Carlos Kroeber
 Carlos Kurt
 Carlos Palma
 Carlos Takeshi
 Carlos Vereza
 Carlos Vergueiro
 Carlos Wilson
 Carlos Zara
 Carmo Dalla Vecchia
 Carvalhinho
 Cassiano Gabus Mendes
 Cássio Gabus Mendes
 Cássio Reis
 Cássio Scapin
 Castrinho
 Castro Gonzaga
 Catalano
 Cauã Reymond
 Cecil Thiré
 Celso Frateschi
 Celso Marques
 Chico Anísio
 Chico Diaz
 Chico Martins
 Chiquinho Brandão
 Christiana Guinle
 Cláudio Cavalcanti
 Cláudio Corrêa e Castro
 Claudio Gabriel
 Claudio Heinrich
 Cláudio Lins
 Cláudio Mamberti
 Cláudio Marzo
 Clayton Silva
 Clementino Kelé
 Coronel Ludugero
 Cosme dos Santos
 Costinha
 Cyl Farney

D 
 Dado Dolabella
 Dalton Vigh
 Dan Stulbach
 Daniel Ávila
 Daniel Boaventura
 Daniel Dantas
 Daniel de Oliveira
 Daniel Del Sarto
 Daniel Erthal
 Daniel Filho
 Daniel Zettel
 Dante Ruy
 Danton Mello
 Darlan Cunha
 Dary Reis
 David Cardoso
 David Neto
 Dedé Santana
 Delano Avelar
 Denis Carvalho
 Diogo Vilela
 Dionísio Azevedo
 Dionísio Neto
 Duam Socci
 Duda Nagle
 Dudu Azevedo
 Dudu Pelizzari

E 
 Edgard Franco
 Edney Giovenazzi
 Edson Celulari
 Edson França
 Eduardo Bakr
 Eduardo Conde
 Eduardo Dusek
 Eduardo Galvão
 Eduardo Lago
 Eduardo Martini
 Eduardo Moscovis
 Eduardo Munniz
 Edward Boggis
 Edwin Luisi
 Élcio Romar
 Elias Gleizer
 Eliezer Gomes
 Emiliano Queiroz
 Emílio Orciollo Neto
 Ênio Gonçalves
 Ênio Santos
 Eri Johnson
 Eriberto Leão
 Erik Marmo
 Ernani Moraes
 Ernesto Piccolo
 Erom Cordeiro
 Evandro Mesquita
 Ewerton de Castro

F 
 Fabiano Augusto
 Fábio Assunção
 Fábio Azevedo
 Fábio Lago
 Fábio Júnior
 Fábio Junqueira
 Fábio Porchat
 Fábio Sabag
 Fábio Villa Verde
 Fausto Rocha
 Felipe Camargo
 Felipe Carone
 Felipe Folgosi
 Felipe Grinnan
 Felipe Kannenberg
 Felipe Martins
 Felipe Neto
 Felipe Pinheiro
 Fernando Almeida
 Fernando Eiras
 Fernando Gomes
 Fernando José
 Fernando Pavão
 Fernando Peixoto
 Fernando Ramos da Silva
 Fernando Reski
 Fernando Torres
 Fiuk
 Flamíneo Fávero
 Flávio Faustinoni
 Flávio Galvão
 Flávio Guarnieri
 Flávio Migliaccio
 Flávio Silvino
 Floriano Peixoto
 Francarlos Reis
 Francisco Cuoco
 Francisco Dantas
 Francisco Di Franco
 Francisco Milani
 Fregolente
 Fulvio Stefanini

G 
 Gabriel Braga Nunes
 Gabriel Wainer
 Genézio de Barros
 Geraldo Hauers Alves
 Geraldo Del Rey
 Germano Filho
 Gero Camilo
 Gero Pestalozzi
 Gerson Brenner
 Gerson de Abreu
 Gerson Steves
 Gervásio Marques
 Gésio Amadeu
 Gian Carlo
 Gianfrancesco Guarnieri
 Gilberto Martinho
 Giuseppe Oristanio
 Gracindo Júnior
 Grande Otelo
 Gregório Duvivier
 Guilherme Berenguer
 Guilherme Corrêa
 Guilherme de Pádua
 Guilherme Fontes
 Guilherme Karan
 Guilherme Leme
 Guilherme Piva
 Guilherme Vieira
 Guilherme Weber
 Guilherme Winter
 Gustavo Goulart
 Gustavo Haddad
 Gustavo Leão
 Gustavo Mello
 Gustavo Paso

H 
 Harildo Deda
 Haroldo Botta
 Haroldo de Oliveira
 Heitor Martinez
 Helber Rangel
 Helder Agostini
 Hélio Souto
 Hemílcio Fróes
 Henri Castelli
 Henri Pagnocelli
 Henrique Martins
 Henrique Mello
 Henrique Pires
 Henry Zaga
 Hermes Barolli
 Herson Capri
 Herval Rossano
 Hugo Carvana
 Hugo Gross
 Humberto Carrão
 Humberto Martins

I 
 Ilya São Paulo
 Iran Malfitano
 Irving São Paulo
 Isaac Bardavid
 Ítalo Rossi
 Ivam Cabral
 Ivan Cândido
 Ivan de Albuquerque
 Ivan de Almeida
 Ivan Mesquita
 Ivan Setta
 Ivo Holanda
 Ivon Curi
 Ivo Müller

J 
 Jackson Antunes
 Jackson costa
 Jacques Lagoa
 Jaime Barcelos
 Jaime Costa
 Jairo Matos
 Jan Louie Baran Amparo
 Jandir Ferrari
 Jardel Filho
 Jardel Mello
 Jason A. Jölsen
 Jayme Matarazzo
 Jayme Periard
 Jean Fercondini
 Jece Valadão
 Jô Soares
 João Antonio
 João Bourbonnais
 João Caetano
 João Carlos Barroso
 João José Pompeo
 João Paulo Adour
 João Rebello
 João Signorelli
 João Velho
 João Vitti
 Joel Barcellos
 Joffre Soares
 John Herbert
 Jonas Bloch
 Jonas Mello
 Jonas Torres
 Jonathan Haagensen
 Jonathan Nogueira
 Jonatas Faro
 Jorge Cherques
 Jorge de Sá
 Jorge Caetano
 Jorge Dória
 Jorge Fernando
 Jorge Laffond
 Jorge Loredo
 Jorge Pontual
 José Augusto Branco
 José D'Artagnan Júnior
 José de Abreu
 José Dumont
 José Lewgoy
 José Maria Santos
 José Mayer
 José Parisi
 José Pimentel
 José Rubens Chachá
 José Wilker
 Joseph Meyer
 Juan Alba
 Juan Daniel
 Juan de Bourbon
 Juca de Oliveira
 Júlio Braga
 Júlio César Cruz

K 
 Kadu Moliterno
 Kayky Brito
 Kito Junqueira
 Kid Mahall
 Klebber Toledo
 Kátia Kieling

L 
 Laerte Morrone
 Lafayette Galvão
 Lauro Corona
 Lauro Góes
 Lázaro Ramos
 Leonardo Brício
 Leonardo Carvalho
 Leonardo Machado
 Leonardo Medeiros
 Leonardo Miggiorin
 Leonardo Vieira
 Leonardo Villar
 Leopoldo Fróes
 Leopoldo Pacheco
 Leiba Raw
 Licurgo Spínola
 Lilico
 Lima Duarte
 Lineu Dias
 Lu Martan
 Luciano Chirolli
 Luciano Szafir
 Luciano Vianna
 Lúcio Mauro
 Lúcio Mauro Filho
 Lugui Palhares
 Lui Mendes
 Luigi Baricelli
 Luigi Picchi
 Luís Carlos Arutim
 Luís Carlos de Moraes
 Luís Delfino
 Luis Gustavo
 Luís Melo
 Luís Salem
 Luiz Armando Queiroz
 Luiz Carlos Braga
 Luís Carlos Miele
 Luiz Carlos Tourinho
 Luiz Carlos Vasconcelos
 Luiz Guilherme
 Luís Linhares
 Luiz Maçãs
 Lutero Luís

M 
 Magalhães Graça
 Malvino Salvador
 Manfredo Colassanti
 Manuel da Nóbrega
 Marcello Antony
 Marcello Melo Jr.
 Marcelo Adnet
 Marcelo Bones
 Marcelo Brou
 Marcelo Capobiango
 Marcelo Faria
 Marcelo Ibrahim
 Marcelo Laham
 Marcelo Mansfield
 Marcelo Médici
 Marcello Novaes
 Marcelo Picchi
 Marcelo Piriggo
 Marcelo Saback
 Marcelo Serrado
 Márcio Garcia
 Márcio Kieling
 Marco Antônio Gimenez
 Marco Antônio Pâmio
 Marco Luque
 Marco Miranda
 Marco Nanini
 Marco Ricca
 Marcos Breda
 Marcos Caruso
 Marcos Frota
 Marcos Mion
 Marcos Oliveira
 Marcos Palmeira
 Marcos Pasquim
 Marcos Paulo
 Marcos Plonka
 Marcos Pitombo
 Marcos Waimberg
 Marcos Winter
 Mario Benvenutti
 Mário Cardoso
 Mário Frias
 Mário Gomes
 Mário Lago
 Mário Sérgio
 Matheus Carrieri
 Matheus Nachtergaele
 Matheus Rocha
 Marthus Matias
 Martim Francisco
 Maurício Destri
 Maurício do Valle
 Maurício Gonçalves
 Maurício Mattar
 Mauro Mendonça
 Max Fercondini
 Mazzaropi
 Micael Borges
 Michel Bercovitch
 Miele
 Miguel Falabella
 Miguel Magno
 Miguel Thiré
 Milhem Cortaz
 Milton Carneiro
 Milton Gonçalves
 Milton Moraes
 Milton Ribeiro
 Moacyr Deriquém
 Murillo Araujo
 Murilo Benício
 Murilo Nery
 Murilo Rosa
 Mussum

N 
 Navarro de Andrade
 Nelson Caruso
 Nelson Dantas
 Nelson Xavier
 Nestor de Montemar
 Newton Prado
 Ney Latorraca
 Neymar
 Nico Puig
 Nicola Siri
 Nildo Parente
 Nill Marcondes
 Nizo Neto
 Norton Nascimento
 Nuno Leal Maia

O 
 Oberdan Junior
 Odilon Wagner
 Older Cazarré
 Olney Cazarré
 Orlando Drummond
 Oscar Magrini
 Oscarito
 Osmar Prado
 Oswaldo Loureiro
 Oswaldo Louzada
 Oswaldo Mendes
 Otávio Augusto
 Otávio Müller
 Otello Zeloni
 Othon Bastos

P 
 Pagano Sobrinho
 Palhaço Xuxu
 Paoletti
 Paulo Autran
 Paulo Betti
 Paulo Castelli
 Paulo Celestino
 Paulo César Grande
 Paulo César Pereio
 Paulo Caruso
 Paulo Coronato
 Paulo Figueiredo
 Paulo Friebe
 Paulo Giardini
 Paulo Gonçalves
 Paulo Gorgulho
 Paulo Goulart
 Paulo Gracindo
 Paulo Guarnieri
 Paulo Hesse
 Paulo José
 Paulo Miklos
 Paulo Nigro
 Paulo Porto
 Paulo Silvino
 Paulo Vilhena
 Paulo Villaça
 Paulo Zulu
 Pedro Cardoso
 Pedro Neschling
 Pedro Paulo Borelli
 Percy Aires
 Perry Salles
 Petrônio Gontijo
 Piolin
 Plínio Marcos
 Procópio Ferreira

R 
 Rafael Almeida
 Rafael Baronesi
 Rafael Calomeni
 Rafael Cardoso
 Rafael L. Silva
 Rafael Zulu
 Ranieri Gonzalez
 Raoni Carneiro
 Raul Cortez
 Raul Gazolla
 Raw Leiba
 Raymundo de Souza
 Reginaldo Faria
 Régis Monteiro
 Reinaldo Gonzaga
 Renato Aragão
 Renato Borghi
 Renato Consorte
 Renato Corte Real
 Renato Master
 Renato Restier
 Reynaldo Gianecchini
 Ricardo Blat
 Ricardo Garcia
 Ricardo Pavão
 Ricardo Pereira
 Ricardo Petraglia
 Ricardo Tozzi
 Robertchay Domingues da Rocha Filho
 Roberto Battaglin
 Roberto Bomtempo
 Roberto Bonfim
 Roberto Maya
 Roberto Pirillo
 Rocco Pitanga
 Rodolfo Arena
 Rodolfo Bottino
 Rodolfo Mayer
 Rodrigo Faro
 Rodrigo Hilbert
 Rodrigo Lombardi
 Rodrigo Moreira da Rocha
 Rodrigo Penna
 Rodrigo Phavanello
 Rodrigo Santoro
 Rodrigo Veronese
 Roger Gobeth
 Rogério Cardoso
 Rogério Fróes
 Rogério Márcico
 Rolando Boldrin
 Rômulo Arantes
 Rômulo Arantes Neto
 Ronald Golias
 Ronnie Marruda
 Ronny Kriwat
 Rony Cócegas
 Rony Rios
 Rubens Corrêa
 Rubens de Falco
 Rui Calisto
 Ruy Rezende

S 
 Sadi Cabral
 Samuel dos Santos
 Sandro Polloni
 Sebastião Vasconcelos
 Selton Mello
 Serafim Gonzalez
 Sérgio Abreu
 Sérgio Britto
 Sérgio Cardoso
 Sérgio Hingst
 Sérgio Hondjakoff
 Sergio Kato
 Sérgio Malheiros
 Sérgio Mamberti
 Sérgio Marone
 Sérgio Menezes
 Sérgio Reis
 Sérgio Viotti
 Sidney Magal
 Sidney Sampaio
 Sílvio de Abreu
 Simplício
 Stênio Garcia
 Stephan Nercessian

T 
 Tadeu Aguiar
 Tarcísio Meira
 Tarcísio Filho
 Tato Gabus Mendes
 Taumaturgo Ferreira
 Thales Pan Chacon
 Théo Becker
 Theodoro Cochrane
 Thiago de Los Reyes
 Thiago Fragoso
 Thiago Lacerda
 Thiago Martins
 Thiago Picchi
 Thiago Rodrigues
 Thierry Figueira
 Tiago Santiago
 Tião D'Ávila
 Tião Macalé
 Tom Cavalcante
 Tonico Pereira
 Tony Ferreira
 Tony Ramos
 Tony Tornado
 Tony Vieira
 Tuca Andrada
 Turíbio Ruiz

U 
 Ulysses Ferraz
 Umberto Magnani

V 
 Vagareza
 Vicente Leporace
 Victor Fasano
 Victor Faviero
 Victor Hygo
 Victor Mature
 Victor Pecoraro
 Victor Wagner
 Vladimir Brichta
 Vinícius Machado

W 
 Wagner Moura
 Wagner Santisteban
 Walmor Chagas
 Waldir Gozzi
 Walter Breda
 Walter D'Ávila
 Wálter Forster
 Werner Schünemann
 Wilson Grey
 Wolf Maia

X 
 Xando Graça
 Xisto Guzzi

Y 
 Yunes Chami

Z 
 Zacarias
 Zanoni Ferrite
 Zé Carlos Machado
 Zé do Caixão
 Zé Trindade
 Zé Victor Castiel
 Zéu Britto
 Zbigniew Ziembiński

Actresses

A 
 Abigail Maia
 Ada Chaseliov
 Adelaide Chiozzo
 Adriana Esteves
 Adriana Lessa
 Adriana Alves
 Adriana Prieto
 Agnes Fontoura
 Aisha Jambo
 Aizita Nascimento
 Alcione Mazzeo
 Alda Garrido
 Aldine Müller
 Alessandra Corrêa
 Alessandra Maestrini
 Alessandra Negrini
 Alessandra Verney
 Alessandra Aguiar
 Alexandra Marzo
 Alice Borges
 Alice Braga
 Alinne Moraes
 Amandha Lee
 Amanda Richter
 Amélia Bittencourt
 Ana Ariel
 Ana Beatriz Nogueira
 Ana Botafogo
 Ana Carbatti
 Ana Cecília Costa
 Ana Kutner
 Ana Lúcia Torre
 Ana Maria Braga
 Ana Maria Nascimento e Silva
 Ana Maria Magalhães
 Ana Paula Arósio
 Ana Paula Bouzas
 Ana Paula Tabalipa
 Ana Paula Vieira
 Ana Roberta Gualda
 Ana Rosa
 Andréa Avancini
 Andréa Beltrão
 Andréa Richa
 Andréa Veiga
 Andréia Horta
 Anecy Rocha
 Ângela Leal
 Ângela Vieira
 Angélica
 Angelina Muniz
 Angelita Feijó
 Anna Sophia Folch
 Annamaria Dias
 Anilza Leoni
 Aracy Balabanian
 Aracy Cardoso
 Aracy Cortes
 Ariclê Perez
 Ariela Massotti
 Arlete Montenegro
 Arlete Salles
 Aurora Miranda
 Aymara Limma

B 
 Babi Xavier
 Bárbara Borges
 Bárbara Bruno
 Bárbara de la Fuente
 Bárbara Paz
 Bárbara Fazzio
 Beatriz Lyra
 Beatriz Segall
 Bel Kutner
 Berta Loran
 Berta Zemmel
 Bete Coelho
 Bete Mendes
 Beth Goulart
 Betty Erthal
 Betty Faria
 Betty Gofman
 Betty Lago
 Bia Montez
 Bia Nunnes
 Bia Seidl
 Bianca Bin
 Bianca Byington
 Bianca Castanho
 Bianca Comparato
 Bianca Rinaldi
 Bibi Ferreira
 Bibi Vogel
 Branca Camargo
 Bruna di Túllio
 Bruna Linzmeyer
 Bruna Lombardi
 Bruna Marquezine

C 
 Cacau Melo
 Cacilda Becker
 Cacilda Lanuza
 Camila Amado
 Camila dos Anjos
 Camila Morgado
 Camila Pitanga
 Camila Rodrigues
 Carla Camurati
 Carla Daniel
 Carla Diaz
 Carla Marins
 Carla Regina
 Carolinie Figueiredo
 Carmem Monegal
 Carmem Silva
 Carmen Miranda
 Carmen Santos
 Carmen Verônica
 Carminha Brandão
 Carol Abras
 Carol Castro
 Carol Machado
 Carolina Dieckmann
 Carolina Ferraz
 Carolina Pavanelli
 Carolina Kasting
 Carolyna Aguiar
 Cássia Kis Magro
 Cássia Linhares
 Catarina Abdala
 Cecília Dassi
 Célia Biar
 Célia Coutinho
 Célia Helena
 Chica Xavier
 Chris Couto
 Christiana Kalache
 Christiana Ubach
 Christiane Torloni
 Christine Fernandes
 Cidinha Milan
 Cidinha Campos
 Cinira Camargo
 Cissa Guimarães
 Clarice Falcão
 Clarisse Abujamra
 Cláudia Abreu
 Cláudia Alencar
 Claudia Jimenez
 Cláudia Lira
 Cláudia Magno
 Cláudia Mauro
 Cláudia Netto
 Cláudia Ohana
 Cláudia Raia
 Cléa Simões
 Cléo Pires
 Cléo Ventura
 Cleyde Blota
 Cleyde Yáconis
 Consuelo Leandro
 Cris Bonna
 Cris Vianna
 Cristiana Oliveira
 Cristina Aché
 Cristina Galvão
 Cristina Mullins
 Cristina Pereira
 Cristina Prochaska
 Cynthia Falabella

D 
 Daisy Lucidi
 Daniela Escobar
 Daniela Camargo
 Daniela Carvalho
 Daniela Faria
 Daniela Perez
 Daniele Suzuki
 Danielle Winits
 Danni Carlos
 Dayenne Mesquita
 Débora Bloch
 Débora Duarte
 Débora Falabella
 Débora Lamm
 Débora Olivieri
 Deborah Evelyn
 Deborah Secco
 Dedina Bernardelli
 Denise Del Vecchio
 Denise Dumont
 Denise Fraga
 Denise Milfont
 Denise Stoklos
 Denise Weinberg
 Dercy Gonçalves
 Diana Morel
 Dilma Lóes
 Dina Sfat
 Dina Lisboa
 Dira Paes
 Dirce Migliaccio
 Diva Pacheco
 Djenane Machado
 Dorinha Duval
 Doris Giesse
 Drica Moraes

E 
 Edith Siqueira
 Elaine Cristina
 Elena Toledo
 Eliana Fonseca
 Eliana Guttman
 Eliana Macedo
 Eliana Ovalle
 Eliane Giardini
 Élida L'Astorina
 Élida Muniz
 Eliete Cigarini
 Elisa Fernandes
 Elisa Lucinda
 Elisa Volpatto
 Elizabeth Hartmann
 Elizabeth Savalla
 Elizângela
 Elke Maravilha
 Ellen Rocche
 Eloísa Mafalda
 Elza Gomes
 Ema D'Ávila
 Enedina Lisboa
 Estelita Bell
 Esther Góes
 Etty Fraser
 Eva Nill
 Eva Todor
 Eva Wilma

F 
 Fabiana Karla
 Fabíula Nascimento
 Fafy Siqueira
 Fátima Freire
 Fernanda de Freitas
 Fernanda Lima
 Fernanda Machado
 Fernanda Montenegro
 Fernanda Muniz
 Fernanda Nobre
 Fernanda Paes Leme
 Fernanda Rodrigues
 Fernanda Souza
 Fernanda Torres
 Fernanda Vasconcellos
 Fiorella Matheis
 Flávia Alessandra
 Flávia Monteiro
 Flora Geny
 Franciely Freduzeski
 Francisca Queiroz
 Françoise Forton

G 
 Gabriela Alves
 Gabriela Duarte
 Geny Prado
 Geórgia Gomide
 Georgiana Góes
 Gilda de Abreu
 Giovanna Antonelli
 Giovanna Ewbank
 Giovanna Lancellotti
 Gisele Fraga
 Gisele Bündchen
 Giselle Itié
 Giselle Policarpo
 Giulia Gam
 Glauce Graieb
 Glauce Rocha
 Glória Menezes
 Glória Pires
 Gorete Milagres
 Gottsha
 Gracinda Freire
 Graziella Moretto
 Graziella Schmitt
 Grazielli Massafera
 Guilhermina Guinle
 Guta Stresser
 Guy Loup

H 
 Helen Ganzarolli
 Helena Ignez
 Helena Ramos
 Helena Ranaldi
 Helena Xavier
 Heloísa Helena
 Heloísa Millet
 Heloísa Périssé
 Henriette Morineau
 Henriqueta Brieba
 Hilda Rebello

I 
 Iara Jamra
 Ida Gomes
 Ildi Silva
 Ilka Soares
 Ilva Niño
 Imara Reis
 Inês Galvão
 Inez Viegas
 Inezita Barroso
 Ingra Liberato
 Ingrid Guimarães
 Iracema de Alencar
 Iracema Starling
 Irene Ravache
 Irene Stefânia
 Íris Bruzzi
 Irma Alvarez
 Isabel Fillardis
 Isabel Ribeiro
 Isabela Garcia
 Isabelle Drummond
 Isadora Ribeiro
 Isaura Bruno
 Ísis de Oliveira
 Ísis Koschdoski
 Ísis Valverde
 Isolda Cresta
 Ítala Nandi
 Itália Fausta
 Ivete Bonfá

J 
 Jackeline Petkovic
 Jacqueline Laurence
 Jacyra Sampaio
 Jacyra Silva
 Janaína Lince
 Jandira Martini
 Jéssika Alves
 Joana Fomm
 Joana Limaverde
 Joana Morcazel
 Júlia Almeida
 Juliana Alves
 Júlia Feldens
 Júlia Lemmertz
 Juliana Lohmann
 Juliana Baroni
 Juliana Didone
 Juliana Knust
 Juliana Martins
 Juliana Mesquita
 Juliana Paes
 Juliana Paiva
 Juliana Schalch
 Juliana Silveira
 Juçara Morais
 Jussara Freire

K 
 Karin Rodrigues
 Karina Bacchi
 Karina Barum
 Karina Perez
 Karine Carvalho
 Kate Hansen
 Kate Lyra
 Kátia D'Angelo
 Katiuscia Canoro
 Kéfera Buchmann

L 
 Laís Pinho
 Lady Francisco
 Larissa Bracher
 Larissa Manoela
 Larissa Maciel
 Larissa Queiroz
 Laura Cardoso
 Laura Neiva
 Lavínia Vlasak
 Léa Camargo
 Léa Garcia
 Leandra Leal
 Leila Cravo
 Leila Lopes
 Leila Diniz
 Leila Miranda
 Leina Krespi
 Lélia Abramo
 Leona Cavalli
 Leonor Lambertini
 Letícia Colin
 Letícia Persiles
 Letícia Sabatella
 Letícia Spiller
 Lia de Aguiar
 Liana Duval
 Lícia Magna
 Lídia Brondi
 Lídia Costa
 Lídia Mattos
 Lígia Cortez
 Lígia Fagundes
 Lília Cabral
 Lilian Lemmertz
 Liliana Castro
 Lívia Falcão
 Liza Vieira
 Lizandra Souto
 Lola Brah
 Lolita Rodrigues
 Louise Cardoso
 Lourdes Mayer
 Lu Grimaldi
 Lu Mendonça
 Lua Blanco
 Luana Piovani
 Lucélia Santos
 Lúcia Lambertini
 Lúcia Mello
 Lúcia Veríssimo
 Luciana Braga
 Luciana Didone
 Luciana Rigueira
 Luciana Vendramini
 Luciene Adami
 Lucinha Lins
 Lucy Mafra
 Lucy Meirelles
 Ludmila Dayer
 Luisa Friese
 Luise Andruskevicius
 Luiza Brunet
 Luiza Curvo
 Luiza Mariani
 Luiza Tomé
 Luma de Oliveira
 Lupe Gigliotti

M 
 Madalena Nicol
 Maíra Dvorek
 Maitê Proença
 Maitê Piragibe
 Mariana Rios
 Maísa
 Malu Mader
 Malu Valle
 Manuela do Monte
 Manoelita Lustosa
 Mara Carvalho
 Mara Manzan
 Mara Rúbia
 Marcela Barrozo
 Marcella Valente
 Márcia Cabrita
 Márcia de Windsor
 Márcia Maria
 Márcia Real
 Márcia Rodrigues
 Maria Alice Vergueiro
 Maria Alves
 Maria Aparecida Alves
 Maria Aparecida Baxter
 Maria Ceiça
 Maria Clara David
 Maria Cláudia
 Maria Della Costa
 Maria Eduarda Machado
 Maria Estela
 Maria Fernanda
 Maria Fernanda Cândido
 Maria Flor
 Maria Gladys
 Maria Helena Dias
 Maria Helena Pader
 Maria Helena Velasco
 Maria Isabel de Lizandra
 Maria João Bastos
 Maria Lúcia Dahl
 Maria Luísa Mendonça
 Maria Luiza Castelli
 Maria Mariana
 Maria Martins
 Maria Maya
 Maria Padilha
 Maria Paula
 Maria Pompeo
 Maria Ribeiro
 Maria Sílvia
 Maria Tereza
 Maria Zilda
 Mariah Rocha
 Mariana Hein
 Mariana Molina
 Mariana Ximenes
 Marieta Severo
 Marília Barbosa
 Marília Gabriela
 Marília Pêra
 Marilu Bueno
 Marina Montini
 Marina Ruy Barbosa

 Marisa Orth
 Marisa Prado
 Marisa Sanches
 Marisol Ribeiro
 Marjorie Estiano
 Marly Bueno
 Martha Overbeck
 Mary Sheyla
 Matilde Mastrangi
 Maximira Figueiredo
 Mayara Magri
 Maytê Piragibe
 Mel Fronckowiak
 Mel Lisboa
 Mika Lins
 Mila Moreira
 Milena Toscano
 Miriam Pires
 Mirian Freeland
 Monah Delacy
 Mônica Carvalho
 Mônica Torres
 Monique Alfradique
 Monique Alves
 Monique Lafond
 Morena Baccarin
 Mylla Christie
 Myriam Mehler
 Myriam Muniz
 Myriam Pérsia
 Myrian Martin
 Myrian Rios

N 
 Nádia Lippi
 Nádia Maria
 Nair Bello
 Nana Gouvêa
 Nanda Costa
 Narjara Turetta
 Natália do Vale
 Natália Guimarães
 Natália Lage
 Nathalia Dill
 Nathália Rodrigues
 Nathalia Timberg
 Nélia Paula
 Neusa Maria Faro
 Neuza Amaral
 Neuza Borges
 Nicette Bruno
 Nina de Pádua
 Nívea Maria
 Nívea Stelmann
 Norah Fontes
 Norma Bengell
 Norma Blum
 Norma Geraldy
 Nydia Lícia

O 
 Odete Lara
 Olivia Torres

P 
 Paloma Duarte
 Paolla Oliveira
 Patrícia Aires
 Patrícia Perrone
 Patrícia Bueno
 Patrícia de Sabrit
 Patrícia França
 Patrícia Mayo
 Patrícia Pillar
 Patrícia Travassos
 Patrícia Werneck
 Paula Burlamaqui
 Paula Lavigne
 Paula Picarelli
 Pepita Rodrigues
 Pérola Faria
 Priscila Camargo
 Priscila Fantin
 Preta Gil

Q 
 Quitéria Chagas

R 
 Rafaela Mandelli
 Raquel Nunes
 Regiane Alves
 Regina Braga
 Regina Casé
 Regina Duarte
 Regina Maria Dourado
 Regina Remencius
 Regina Restelli
 Rejane Arruda
 Renata Castro Barbosa
 Renata Dominguez
 Renata Fronzi
 Renata Sorrah
 Renée de Vielmond
 Reny de Oliveira
 Rita Cadilac
 Rita Cléos
 Rita Guedes
 Riva Nimitz
 Roberta Indio do Brasil
 Roberta Rodrigues
 Rosamaria Murtinho
 Rosana Garcia
 Rosane Gofman
 Rosanne Mulholland
 Rose Lima
 Rose Rondelli
 Rosi Campos
 Rossana Ghessa
 Ruth de Souza
 Ruth Escobar
 Ruth Romcy

S 
 Sandy Leah
 Samara Felippo
 Samantha Schmütz
 Sandra Annenberg
 Sandra Barsotti
 Sandra Bréa
 Sandra Pêra
 Selma Egrei
 Sheron Menezzes
 Silvia Bandeira
 Silvia Buarque
 Silvia Pfeifer
 Sílvia Salgado
 Simone Carvalho
 Simone Spoladore
 Solange Couto
 Solange Theodoro
 Sônia Braga
 Sônia Clara
 Sônia de Paula
 Sônia Guedes
 Sônia Mamede
 Sônia Oiticica
 Sônia Regina
 Sophia Abrahão
 Sophie Charlotte
 Soraya Ravenle
 Stella Freitas
 Stella Miranda
 Sthefany Brito
 Suely Franco
 Sura Berditchevsky
 Susana Werner
 Suzana Alves
 Suzana Faini
 Suzana Gonçalves
 Suzana Pires
 Suzana Vieira
 Suzy Camacho
 Suzy Rêgo
 Sylvia Bandeira
 Sylvia Massari

T 

 Taís Araújo
 Talita Castro
 Tamara Taxman
 Tammy Di Calafiori
 Tânia Alves
 Tânia Bondezan
 Tânia Kalil
 Tânia Scher
 Tarciana Saad
 Tássia Camargo
 Tatiana Issa
 Tatyane Goulart
 Teca Pereira
 Telma Cunha
 Tereza Raquel
 Tereza Seiblitz
 Terezinha Sodré
 Tessy Callado
 Tetê Pritzl
 Thaila Ayala
 Thaís de Andrade
 Thaís de Campos
 Thaís Fersoza
 Thaís Pacholek
 Thaíssa Carvalho
 Thalma de Freitas
 Thelma Reston
 Theresa Amayo
 Tônia Carrero
 Totia Meirelles

U

V 
 Valéria Alencar
 Valquíria Ribeiro
 Vanda Lacerda
 Vanessa de Oliveira
 Vanessa Gerbelli
 Vanessa Giácomo
 Vanessa Goulart
 Vanessa Lóes
 Vera Fischer
 Vera Gimenez
 Vera Holtz
 Vera Manhães
 Vera Zimmermann
 Via Negromonte
 Vic Militello
 Victória Rocha
 Viétia Zangrandi
 Vida Alves
 Violeta Ferraz
 Vivianne Pasmanter
 Viviane Victorette

W 
 Walderez de Barros
 Wanda Stefânia
 Wanda Kosmo
 Wilma de Aguiar
 Wilma Dias
 Wilza Carla

X 
 Xuxa Lopes
 Xuxa Meneghel

Y 
 Yaçanã Martins
 Yanna Lavigne
 Yara Amaral
 Yara Cortes
 Yara Lins
 Yachmin Gazal
 Yoná Magalhães
 Yolanda Cardoso

Z 
 Zaira Bueno
 Zaira Zambelli
 Zaquia Jorge
 Zeny Pereira
 Zezé Macedo
 Zezé Motta
 Zezé Polessa
 Zezeh Barbosa
 Zilka Salaberry
 Zilda Cardoso
 Zilda Mayo

 
Actors
Brazilian